Lord Saltoun, of Abernethy, is a title in the Peerage of Scotland. It was created in 1445 for Sir Lawrence Abernethy. The title remained in the Abernethy family until the death in 1669 of his descendant the tenth Lady Saltoun. She was succeeded by her cousin Alexander Fraser, the eleventh Lord. He was the son of Alexander Fraser and Margaret Abernethy, daughter of the seventh Lord Saltoun. The title has remained in the Frasers of Philorth family ever since.

The seventeenth Lord was a Lieutenant-General in the Army and sat in the House of Lords as a Scottish Representative Peer from 1807 to 1853. His nephew, the eighteenth Lord, was a Scottish Representative Peer from 1859 to 1866. His son, the nineteenth Lord, and grandson, the twentieth Lord, were also Scottish Representative Peers, between 1890 and 1933 and 1935 and 1963, respectively. Since 1979, the title has been held by the latter's daughter, the 21st Lady Saltoun. She is head of the Frasers of Philorth and was also one of the ninety elected hereditary peers that remain in the House of Lords after the passing of the House of Lords Act 1999 (resigning her seat in the House in 2014).

In the 20th century, it was determined that Margaret Abernethy (now 10th Lady Saltoun), succeeded her brother, Alexander Abernethy, 9th Lord Saltoun, in 1668, but only survived him by about 10 weeks and had not previously been counted in the title's numbering. This new information has resulted in the ordinals in subsequent Lords Saltoun being revised. As a result, the later heirs to the title are often referenced with the incorrect numbering.

The family seats are Inverey House, near Braemar, Aberdeenshire and Cairnbulg Castle, near Fraserburgh, Aberdeenshire.

Lords Saltoun (1445)
Lawrence Abernethy, 1st Lord Saltoun (1400–1460)
William Abernethy, 2nd Lord Saltoun (d. 1488)
James Abernethy, 3rd Lord Saltoun (d. 1505), brother of the 2nd Lord
Alexander Abernethy, 4th Lord Saltoun (d. 1527)
William Abernethy, 5th Lord Saltoun (d. 1540)
Alexander Abernethy, 6th Lord Saltoun (d. 1587)
George Abernethy, 7th Lord Saltoun (1555–1590)
John Abernethy, 8th Lord Saltoun (1578–1612)
Alexander Abernethy, 9th Lord Saltoun (1611–1668)
Margaret Abernethy, 10th Lady Saltoun (1609–1669) (not traditionally counted)
Alexander Fraser, 11th Lord Saltoun (1604–1693) (traditionally 10th Lord)
William Fraser, 12th Lord Saltoun (1654–1715) (traditionally 11th Lord)
Alexander Fraser, 13th Lord Saltoun (1684–1748) (traditionally 12th Lord)
Alexander Fraser, 14th Lord Saltoun (1710–1751) (traditionally 13th Lord)
George Fraser, 15th Lord Saltoun (1720–1781) (traditionally 14th Lord)
Alexander Fraser, 16th Lord Saltoun (1758–1793) (traditionally 15th Lord)
Alexander George Fraser, 17th Lord Saltoun (1785–1853) (traditionally 16th Lord)
Alexander Fraser, 18th Lord Saltoun (1820–1886) (traditionally 17th Lord)
Alexander William Frederick Fraser, 19th Lord Saltoun (1851–1933) (traditionally 18th Lord)
Alexander Arthur Fraser, 20th Lord Saltoun (1886–1979) (traditionally 19th Lord)
Flora Marjory Fraser, 21st Lady Saltoun (b. 1930) (traditionally 20th Lady)

The heir presumptive is the present holder's daughter Katharine Ingrid Mary Isabel Fraser, Mistress of Saltoun (born 1957).
The heir presumptive's heir apparent is her son Alexander William Malise Fraser (born 1990) who acted as Page of Honour to Queen Elizabeth II.

See also
Lord Saltoun and Auchanachie, a Scottish folk song

Footnotes

References

Saltoun
Noble titles created in 1445
Clan Fraser